Paul Hull Julian (June 25, 1914 – September 5, 1995), better known as Paul Julian, was an American background animator, sound effects artist and voice actor for Warner Bros. Cartoons. He worked on Looney Tunes short films, primarily on director Friz Freleng's Sylvester and Tweety Bird shorts.

During his time at Warner, Julian also provided the vocal effects of the Road Runner. His warm and tightly-cropped urban scenes were also featured early in his career in the Bugs Bunny film Baseball Bugs (1946), and in the crime syndicate-themed Daffy Duck film Golden Yeggs (1950). Julian also created New Deal murals in California. Julian died in Van Nuys, California at the age of 81.

Life and career

Julian was born on June 25, 1914 in Illinois. In October 1939, he landed a job in Los Angeles as layout and background artist at Leon Schlesinger's animation studio, "Termite Terrace". Two years later, he was one of the ealy staff members of UPA. In 1945, he returned to Warner Bros Cartoons, where he was mainly assigned primarily to Friz Freleng's unit, he became highly regarded for his colourful, modernist city-scape paintings for Sylvester and Tweety cartoons, as well as for Bugs Bunny and Daffy Duck shorts.

Julian worked on New Deal mural projects all around Southern California prior to beginning his career in Hollywood. In 1942 his mural Orange Picking was created for the interior of the Fullerton, California post office. That year he also created a WPA mural for the Upland Elementary School in Upland, California, at the side of the school auditorium. Though faded, the murals are in decent shape. Julian used a technique called petrachrome that utilized 24 different colors of marble to complete the mural's four panels. The mural inside the Fullerton Post Office is in excellent condition.

Later, while working at Warner Brothers as a background artist, Julian provided the Road Runner's "Beep-Beep!" sound. Julian first made the sound in the hallway on the Warner Bros. studio lot. He imitated a car horn to signal to get people out of his way when he was in a hurry with a large painting. The sound was picked up by director Chuck Jones and it was used in Fast and Furry-ous. It was sped up by editor Treg Brown. These recordings are still in use in modern Looney Tunes media.

Julian directed the animated films Baby Boogie (1955) for UPA, and The Hangman (1964), which was produced by Les Goldman. The Hangman,  garnered over 15 international film festival awards.  He also was a background and production designer for Hanna-Barbera and for the 1978 anime fantasy Winds of Change, based on Ovid's Metamorphoses. Julian also had a long working relationship with Roger Corman providing artwork for many of his movies, including Dementia 13 and The Terror.

Julian was still working as an artist when he died in Van Nuys, California in 1995.

Partial filmography

Background artist
That's Warner Bros.!
FernGully: The Last Rainforest
My Little Pony: The Movie
Hare Trigger
I Taw a Putty Tat
Elmer's Candid Camera
Elmer's Pet Rabbit

Actor
Soup or Sonic - The Road Runner
Fast and Furry-ous - The Road Runner
Sugar and Spies - The Road Runner
The Road Runner Show - The Road Runner
Freeze Frame - The Road Runner
Boulder Wham! - The Road Runner
Chariots of Fur - The Road Runner (last cartoon produced in Paul Julian's lifetime)
Coyote Falls - The Road Runner
Fur of Flying - The Road Runner 
Rabid Rider - The Road Runner 
Flash in the Pain - The Road Runner 
Chaser on the Rocks - The Road Runner
Hopalong Casualty - The Road Runner
Dexter's Laboratory - Dee-Dee imitating the Road Runner
Space Jam - The Road Runner
Bugs Bunny's Bustin' Out All Over - The Road Runner
The Electric Company - The Road Runner
Zip Zip Hooray! - The Road Runner

References

External links
 
 

1914 births
1995 deaths
20th-century American male actors
American illustrators
American production designers
American speculative fiction artists
American male voice actors
Background artists
Fantasy artists
Warner Bros. Cartoons people
Warner Bros. Cartoons voice actors
Hanna-Barbera people
Section of Painting and Sculpture artists
Federal Art Project artists